The Navesink Twin Lights is a non-operational lighthouse and museum located in Highlands, Monmouth County, New Jersey, United States, overlooking Sandy Hook Bay, the entrance to the New York Harbor and the Atlantic Ocean.

In 1962, the State of New Jersey acquired Twin Lights. At the current museum facility, tours of the lighthouse, a climb of the North Tower and its expansive ocean view, and a view of the lighthouse equipment, await visitors. Twin Lights is listed on the State and National Register of Historic Places, and was designated a National Historic Landmark in 2006 for its architecture and its role in the development of lighthouse technologies.

The Twin Lights State Historic Site is part of the New Jersey Coastal Heritage Trail Route.

History

A lighthouse existed on the site since 1828, when it became an important guide and landmark for ships navigating the treacherous entrances to New York Harbor.

The current lighthouse was constructed in 1862. The non-identical towers by day and the two beacons by night—one flashing and one fixed—allowed ready identification by mariners of the identity of the facility, thus allowing a rough determination of their location approaching the harbor.

This was the first American lighthouse to test a Fresnel lens and was also the site of a demonstration by Marconi of the wireless telegraph in 1899.  A bi-valve fresnel lens is on display in the museum.

The north tower light was discontinued in 1898; at the same time the south tower was electrified, one of the first lighthouses in the United States to do so. It was automated in 1949, but was discontinued in 1952 as the importance of the light diminished.

In 1962, the site was turned over to the state of New Jersey, by the Borough of Highlands.  The sixth order lens was previously acquired and installed in the north tower by the Shrewsbury Power Squadron and presented to the town which reactivated the north tower as a private aid to navigation. This light remains active.

References

External links

Lighthouses of New York Harbor - Navesink Twin Lights
Navesink Lighthouse and Robbins Reef Lighthouse: Lighting the Way Through New York Bay, a National Park Service Teaching with Historic Places (TwHP) lesson plan

Lighthouses completed in 1862
Lighthouses on the National Register of Historic Places in New Jersey
Museums in Monmouth County, New Jersey
Lighthouse museums in New Jersey
National Historic Landmark lighthouses
National Historic Landmarks in New Jersey
Highlands, New Jersey
National Register of Historic Places in Monmouth County, New Jersey
1862 establishments in New Jersey
New Jersey Register of Historic Places
Transportation buildings and structures in Monmouth County, New Jersey